Stefan Dott (born 27 September 1969 in Koblenz, Rheinland-Pfalz) is a German judoka and former European Champion. He is now executive officer of SAUBER ENERGIE (provider of renewable energy), and authorised representative of the power provider Rhenag. Dott lives in Frechen, near Cologne.

References

External links
 

1969 births
Living people
German male judoka
Judoka at the 1992 Summer Olympics
Judoka at the 1996 Summer Olympics
Olympic judoka of Germany
Sportspeople from Koblenz
20th-century German people